This was the first edition of the tournament.

Jurij Rodionov won the title after defeating Jiří Lehečka 6–4, 6–4 in the final.

Seeds

Draw

Finals

Top half

Bottom half

References

External links
Main draw
Qualifying draw

Upper Austria Open - 1
Upper Austria Open